Elizabeth Vidal (born 10 June 1960) is a French operatic coloratura soprano born in Nice to a Spanish father and a British mother. She was appointed teacher of singing at the Conservatory of Nice in 2009.

She appeared on the French show, On n'est pas couché on 19 April 2014 to present her CD album La Cantadora with classic/modern crossover music.

She was appointed Chevalier of the Ordre des Arts et des Lettres.

References

External links

"Elizabeth Vidal : Soprano aux mille couleurs", L'Express (Mauritius), 18 March 2013. 

1960 births
Living people
People from Nice
French operatic sopranos
20th-century French women opera singers
21st-century French women  opera singers
Chevaliers of the Ordre des Arts et des Lettres